Guy Fréquelin (born 2 April 1945 at Langres) is a French former rally and sports car driver.

Biography
Perhaps Fréquelin's finest hour as a driver came when he finished runner-up only to Ari Vatanen, alongside then-navigator Jean Todt, at the wheel of a briefly competitive Sunbeam Lotus Talbot in the driver's classification of the 1981 World Rally Championship. It was during that year that he collected his only individual rally victory in the series, in Rally Argentina.

Fréquelin was also part of a four-car Renault assault on the 24 Hours of Le Mans in 1977 with their highly successful Alpine Renault A442B. As part of a team which included the French racing drivers, Jean-Pierre Jabouille, Jacques Laffite, Patrick Depailler, Patrick Tambay, Jean-Pierre Jaussaud, René Arnoux and Didier Pironi, as well as the English long distance expert Derek Bell, Fréquelin was named as the third driver for both the #7 Tambay/Jaussaud and the #16 Arnoux/Pironi machines. Neither cars were to finish the race. Tambay and Jaussaud eventually retired after just 158 laps with engine troubles to blame, while the sister #16 Arnoux/Pironi car was immediately out, with no laps registered to its name, after a turbo oil seal caused a fire. Fréquelin, though, was to return to the Sarthe circuit for the 1981 race, paired with countryman Roger Dorchy in the #5 WM P79/80 Peugeot. Again, though, he scored only a DNF after an engine fire forced the pair's exit after 46 laps.

In more recent years, Fréquelin has held a position as Team Principal at the Citroën Total World Rally Team. He retired at the end of 2007. In this position he oversaw the four consecutive world championship titles of Sébastien Loeb and an impressive number of victories in the Paris Dakar and in WRC, with cars such as the ZX, the Xsara and the C4.

In rallying circles he is nicknamed the Grizzly.

WRC victories
{|class="wikitable"
!  # 
! Event
! Season
! Co-driver
! Car
|-
| 1
|  3º Rally Codasur
| 1981
| Jean Todt
| Talbot Sunbeam Lotus
|-
!colspan=5|
|}

Racing record

Complete WRC results

Complete 24 Hours of Le Mans results

References

1945 births
French rally drivers
Living people
People from Langres
24 Hours of Le Mans drivers
World Rally Championship drivers
World Sportscar Championship drivers
Sportspeople from Haute-Marne